Brachythoraci is an extinct suborder of arthrodire placoderms, armored fish most diverse during the Devonian.

Phylogeny
Arthrodira is divided into three main groups: the paraphyletic Actinolepida and Phlyctaenii, and then the monophyletic Brachythoraci. Brachythoraci is then further divided into the large derived clade Eubrachythoraci and several basal groups: Buchanosteoidea, Homosteidae, and Holonematidae. (Although Holonematidae's membership in Brachythoraci is disputed.)

Below is a cladogram from the 2016 Zhu et al. phylogenetic study:

References

Arthrodires
Prehistoric animal suborders
Fish suborders